{{Taxobox
| name =  'Pseudomonas' carboxydohydrogena
| domain = Bacteria
| phylum = Pseudomonadota
| classis = Alphaproteobacteria
| ordo = Hyphomicrobiales
| familia = Nitrobacteraceae
| genus = Afipia
| binomial = Pseudomonas' carboxydohydrogena| binomial_authority = (ex Sanjieva and Zavarzin 1971)  Meyer et al. 1980
| synonyms = * Seliberia carboxydohydrogena Sanjieva and Zavarzin 1971
}} 'Pseudomonas' carboxydohydrogena''' is a species of Gram-negative bacteria. Following 16S rRNA phylogenetic analysis, it was determined that  'P.' carboxydohydrogena'' belonged in the Bradyrhizobium rRNA lineage. It has not yet been further classified.

References

External links
Type strain of Pseudomonas carboxydohydrogena at BacDive -  the Bacterial Diversity Metadatabase

Nitrobacteraceae
Bacteria described in 1980